Heimfeld is a quarter of Hamburg, Germany in the Harburg borough.

Geography
Heimfeld borders the quarters Hausbruch, Moorburg, Harburg, and Eißendorf. In the southwest it borders Lower Saxony.

Politics
These are the results of Heimfeld in the Hamburg state election:

References 

Quarters of Hamburg
Harburg, Hamburg